Choerophryne fafniri is a species of frog in the family Microhylidae. It is endemic to Papua New Guinea and is only known from the north-western slopes of Mount Giluwe and south-east of Mount Hagen in the Southern Highlands Province.

Etymology
This species was originally described in the genus Albericus, named for Alberich, the dwarf in Scandinavian mythology and Richard Wagner's opera cycle Der Ring des Nibelungen. Menzies named the species he described after Alberich's companions in the mythodology. The specific name fafniri is derived from Fafnir.

Description
Choerophryne fafniri is a comparatively large species: six unsexed individuals in the type series measure  in snout–urostyle length. It is very similar to Choerophryne darlingtoni. The flanks and belly are orange to dark red and heavily blotched with brown. There are usually vague lumbar ocelli.

The male advertisement call has been described as a "slow buzz". Note length is comparatively long at about 650 ms. Pulse rate starts slow, then increases abruptly, before slowing again.

Habitat and conservation
It is locally common. No major threats to it are known, although selective logging is a possible threat.

References

fafniri
Amphibians of Papua New Guinea
Endemic fauna of Papua New Guinea
Amphibians described in 1999
Taxonomy articles created by Polbot